The 2013 North Dakota State Bison football team represented North Dakota State University in the 2013 NCAA Division I FCS football season. They were led by head coach Craig Bohl, in his 11th and ultimately final season, as he left to become the head coach at Wyoming after the season. The team, which played their 21st season in the Fargodome, entered the season as the two-time defending national champions. The Bison have been members of the Missouri Valley Football Conference since the 2008 season.

The season started with a road win over defending Big 12 champion Kansas State 24–21, in front of the second-largest crowd in Wildcats history. According to ESPN.com, Kansas State paid the Bison $350,000 for the matchup. This was the Bison's fourth straight win against an FBS opponent and seventh overall.

The university hosted ESPN College GameDay on September 21, 2013, as the Bison faced Delaware State that afternoon and defeated the Hornets 51–0. This was the first time in the show's history that it was broadcast live from downtown Fargo, and was a rare feature of a non-FBS program. On October 12, in a home game against Missouri State, the Fargodome set a new single-game attendance record (19,108).

With a win at Youngstown State, the Bison won their third consecutive MVFC title, and clinched an automatic playoff spot. The Bison finished the regular season with a perfect overall record of 11–0, their first undefeated record since 1990. NDSU received 17 points in the final AP Poll of the 2013 season, which would have ranked them 29th if that poll ranked teams beyond the top 25.

On December 9, 2013, Bohl was introduced as the next head coach at Wyoming effective at the end of the season. On December 15, Bison defensive coordinator Chris Klieman was selected as Bohl's successor as head coach for the 2014 season.

Their victory in the 2013 FCS title game, held on January 4, 2014 at Toyota Stadium in the Dallas suburb of Frisco, Texas, made the Bison only the second team to win three consecutive FCS national titles, following the run from 2005 to 2007 by Appalachian State. The Bison were also the first unbeaten FCS champions since Marshall in 1996.

Schedule

 Source: Schedule ‡ Denotes single-game home attendance record.

Coaching staff

Game summaries

at Kansas State

Box Score. 2nd-largest crowd in Kansas State history (53,351).

Ferris State

Box Score

Delaware State

Box Score

at South Dakota State

Box Score. Set a new home attendance record for South Dakota State (16,498).

‡Met twice in 2012, once in the regular season and again in the second round of the FCS playoffs. The Bison won the regular season game 20–17.

Northern Iowa

Box Score

Missouri State

Box Score. New home attendance record.

at Southern Illinois

Box Score

at Indiana State

Box Score
‡NDSU's only loss in 2012.

Illinois State

Box Score

at Youngstown State

Box Score

South Dakota

Furman—NCAA Division I Second Round

Coastal Carolina—NCAA Division I Quarterfinal

New Hampshire—NCAA Division I Quarterfinal

Towson—NCAA Division I Championship Game

Ranking movements
AP Poll

FCS polls

References

North Dakota State
NCAA Division I Football Champions
North Dakota State Bison football seasons
Missouri Valley Football Conference champion seasons
North Dakota State
College football undefeated seasons
North Dakota State Bison football